α-Longipinene synthase (EC 4.2.3.80) is an enzyme with systematic name (2E,6E)-farnesyl-diphosphate diphosphate-lyase (α-longipinene-forming). This enzyme catalyses the following chemical reaction

 (2E,6E)-farnesyl diphosphate  α-longipinene + diphosphate

The enzyme from Norway spruce produces longifolene as the main product.

References

External links 
 

EC 4.2.3